Ytterby IS is a Swedish football team from Kungälv, currently playing in Division 3 Västra Götaland. The team was founded in 1947.

Background

Ytterby IS men's team plays in Division 3. The club was founded by Harry Karlsson in 1947. Club facilities consists of a full-size artificial turf pitch and a number of grass pitches.

For much of the 1990s Ytterby IS played in Division 3 Nordvästra Götaland which was then the fourth tier of Swedish football.  They were finally promoted at the end of the 1999 season and spent the next 5 seasons in Division 2 Västra Götaland before being relegated at the end of the 2004 season.  The club then spent another 4 seasons back in Division 3 Nordvästra Götaland but in 2008 won promotion to Division 2 Västra Götaland followed by a further promotion in 2009 to Division 1 Södra.

Ytterby IS are affiliated to the Göteborgs Fotbollförbund.

Current squad

Season to season

References

External links
 Ytterby IS – official site

Football clubs in Västra Götaland County
Association football clubs established in 1947
1947 establishments in Sweden